Baghestan (formerly, Khademabad (Persian: خادم آباد), also Romanized as Khādemābād and Khādamābād; also known as Khādemābād-e Qods and Muslemabad) is a city in the Central District of Shahriar County, Tehran province, Iran. At the 2006 census, its population was 52,330 in 12,810 households. The following census in 2011 counted 71,861 people in 19,306 households. The latest census in 2016 showed a population of 83,934 people in 23,787 households.

Transportation

The city is served by buses from the municipal-run Baghestan City and Suburbs Bus Organization, connecting the city to Shahriar and Tehran.

References 

Shahriar County

Cities in Tehran Province

Populated places in Tehran Province

Populated places in Shahriar County